Year 1065 (MLXV) was a common year starting on Saturday (link will display the full calendar) of the Julian calendar.

Events 
 By place 

 Europe 
 December 24 – King Ferdinand I (the Great) dies in León after an 11-year reign as Emperor of All Spain. His kingdom is divided among his three sons: the eldest Sancho II, the second  Alfonso VI and the youngest García II. The kingdoms of Galicia and Portugal become independent under the rule of García.

 England 
 October 3 – Northumbria rebels against Tostig, who is exiled. He takes refuge with his brother-in-law, Count Baldwin V in Flanders (modern Belgium). The Northumbrian nobles choose Morcar (or Morkere) as earl at York.
 December 28 – Westminster Abbey is consecrated by King Edward the Confessor.

 Seljuk Empire 
 Alp Arslan, leader of the Seljuk Turks, campaigns against the Kipchaks and the Türkmen in Central Asia. He captures the city of Kars and plunders the western provinces of Georgia.

 China 
 Sima Guang, chancellor of the Song Dynasty, heads a team of scholars in initiating the compilation of an enormous written universal history of China, known as the Zizhi Tongjian.

 By topic 

 Religion 
 Great German Pilgrimage: A large pilgrimage led by Archbishop Siegfried I of Mainz arrives in Jerusalem after having been attacked by Bedouin bandits. Two weeks later they return to Ramla in April and take ships back to Latakia.
Gregory II is consecrated as catholicos of the Armenian church in Tzamandos

 Astronomy 
 Guest Star: There is a “guest star” event reported in ancient Chinese records. It happened in 1065 BC, and may be related to the Strottner-Drechsler Object 20 nebula.

Births 
 Agnes of Rheinfelden, duchess of Swabia (d. 1111)
 Callixtus II, pope of the Catholic Church (d. 1124)
 Guarinus of Sitten, bishop of Sion (approximate date)
 Henry I (the Long), German nobleman (d. 1087)
 Hugh VII of Lusignan, count of La Marche (d. 1151)
 Humbert II (the Fat), count of Savoy (d. 1103)
 Li Jie, Chinese writer of the Song Dynasty (d. 1110)
 Niels (or Nicholas), king of Denmark (d. 1134)
 Richard de Montfort, French nobleman (d. 1092)
 Robert II, count of Flanders (approximate date)
 Sibylla of Burgundy, duchess of Burgundy (approximate date)
 Stephen I, count palatine of Burgundy (d. 1102)
 Vladislaus I, duke of Bohemia (approximate date)
 Walter Tirel (or William Rufus), English nobleman

Deaths 
 February 7 – Siegfried I, count of Sponheim
 May 17 – Egilbert (or Engelbert), bishop of Passau
 May 18 – Frederick, duke of Lower Lorraine
 June 27 – George the Hagiorite, Georgian calligrapher (b. 1009)
 July 22 – Ibn Abi Hasina, Arab poet and panegyrist (b. 998)
 July 23 – Gunther of Bamberg, German nobleman
 December 24 – Ferdinand I (the Great), king of León and Castile 
 Diarmaid mac Tadgh Ua Ceallaigh, king of Uí Maine
 Ermengol III (or Armengol), count of Urgell (b. 1032)
 Gisela (or Gizella), queen consort of Hungary (b. 985)
 Gomes Echigues, Portuguese knight and governor (b. 1010)
 Gusiluo, Tibetan religious leader of Buddhism (b. 997)
 Llywelyn Aurdorchog, Welsh nobleman (approximate date)
 Thorfinn (the Mighty), Norse nobleman (approximate date)

References